Yaburovo is a rural locality (a village) in Beryozovskoye Rural Settlement, Beryozovsky District, Perm Krai, Russia. The population was 19 as of 2010.

Geography 
Yaburovo is located on the Shakva River, 5 km west of  Beryozovka, the district's administrative centre, by road. Vanino is the nearest rural locality.

References 

Rural localities in Beryozovsky District, Perm Krai